The Port of Inverness (Scottish Gaelic: Port Inbhir Nis) is a port on the east coast of Scotland, at Inverness, Highland council area, at the mouth of the River Ness. It is one of Scotland's most sheltered and deep natural ports. The port is owned and operated by Inverness Harbour Trust, established by Act of Parliament in 1847. The port was first recorded in history in 1249.

The port trades with Scandinavia, the EU and the rest of the UK. Goods handled include oil and fuel, turbines for wind energy converters, timber, round logs, board, wood chips, coal, salt, animal feed, frozen fish, fish oil and other goods. Due to recent expansion the port can now handle cargoes of turbine blades of length up to 50 m. There are extensive lay down areas as well as covered storage facilities. The port has easy access to the A9 road and the hinterland of Inverness, the capital of the Scottish Highlands. There is also ready access to the railway system from Inverness station. Recent years have seen cargo close to 800,000 tonnes per annum and over 300 vessels visiting the port.

The port has four main quays: North Longman 150 m in length; Longman 340 m in length; North Citadel 100 m in length and; South Citadel (tanker berth) 150 m in length.
Bunkering by road tanker can be provided by prior arrangement.
While the Port of Inverness can handle smaller cruise vessels, larger cruise liners tend to go to Invergordon which is a deep water port about 24 miles from Inverness on the Cromarty Firth and allows docking and disembarkation of passengers without the need of a Ship's tender.
Next to the Port of Inverness is Inverness Marina which can offer berthing for yachts.

References

External links 

 Ports.com, Port of Inverness
British Ports Association, Inverness Harbour Trust
Gazetteer for Scotland Inverness Harbour (Port of Inverness)
Port of Inverness-Marine Traffic
Port of Inverness-Port Directory

Ports and harbours of the North Sea
Ports and harbours of Scotland
Buildings and structures in Inverness
Transport in Inverness